A refuge siding is a single-ended, or dead-end, siding off a running line, which may be used to temporarily accommodate a train so that another one can pass it. For example, a refuge siding might be used by a slow goods train to allow a fast passenger train to pass. It is similar in concept to a passing loop but is connected to the main line at only one end, rather than both ends.

Japan 
On the Japanese railway network, 8 refuge sidings (known locally as a form of switchback) remain in day-to-day use - Obasute Station, Hatsukari Station, Nihongi Station, Tsubojiri Station, Shingai Station,  and  - while 48 former refuge sidings, now converted into conventional passing loops or abandoned, are attested. They are mostly used by stopping passenger trains and freight trains, especially in cases where express trains are scheduled to pass.

Australia 
 Fish River - up and down refuge sidings on double track 
 Otford - up and down refuge sidings on double track 
 Berry - refuge siding 
 Dombarton up and down refuge sidings 
 Capertee refuge and goods sidings 
 Cowan - up refuge sidings on double track  converted to loop.

Sometimes refuge sidings were needed where there were steep ramps on the line. For example, at Gresford railway station in Australia, the gradient was so steep that a refuge siding was required at the station in case some of the wagons or coaches of a train had to be left behind so that it could climb the hill. 

In British and Australian practice at least, it was common to refer to such sidings as an "Up refuge siding" or "Down refuge siding" depending on the orientation of the siding in relation to the direction of travel.

See also 
 Passing loop

 Settle-Carlisle line, where there used to be many refuge sidings in the age of steam.

References 

Railway sidings

de:Gleisanschluss#Ausweichanschlussstelle